SM-Sarja was the top level of ice hockey in Finland from 1928 to 1975. SM-sarja is a common abbreviation for Suomen mestaruussarja, "Finnish Championship Series".

There was variable number of teams playing for the Finnish championship during the time of SM-sarja. The lowest number of participating teams was during the 1935 SM-sarja season when there was 3 teams. The most common number of participating teams was 12.

Since 1944-45 SM-sarja season there was relegations for lowest-ranking teams of each season. In the relegations the lowest-ranking teams either faced the winner of the 1. Divisioona (1st Division) or was straightly relegated from SM-sarja.

History 

The first SM-sarja season took place in 1928. The first championship was competed as a cup. Viipurin Reipas was the winning team and they became the first Finnish ice hockey champions. SM-sarja was cancelled in 1930 because of bad winter in Finland. SM-sarja was also cancelled in 1940, 1942 and during the 1944 season because of the Winter War and the Continuation War

SM-sarja was played in amateur principles so the clubs were not supposed to pay their players beyond compensation for lost wages. However, as ice hockey evolved in Finland some teams started to be handled like Businesses. In the 1960s, two leading Finnish household machine factories UPO and Rosenlew established their own ice hockey teams, Upon Pallo and Rosenlewin Urheilijat -38. These teams were run by the money of the owning companies and the players were bought from the neighbouring teams. This would be the first steps towards professionalism.

By the 1970s the concept of amateur ice hockey was turning out of date as there was commercials on players uniforms and bigger money involved in teams and in 1975 SM-sarja played its last season and was replaced by SM-liiga (Finnish Championship League) for 1976 season.

The last team to win the Finnish championship under SM-sarja was Tappara.

Formats 
Between 1928 and 1933 SM-sarja Championship was contested under Cup rules.

After 1933 SM-sarja was contested as a league. In 1951 SM-sarja was divided to 2 groups and the Play Offs were introduced.

The SM-sarja moved back to one group play in 1959 though the two group-system returned for 1965–66 SM-sarja season.

SM-sarja Teams 

Teams in bold still play in SM-liiga.
HPS
TaPa
Viipurin Reipas
HJK
KIF
HIFK
Tampereen Pyrintö
ÅIFK
ViPS
Turun Riento
Ilves
HSK
Tarmo
TPS
TBK/Tappara
Karhu-Kissat
TuPK
Arsenal
HPK
Lukko
TP-V
KuPS
KyPa
Töölön Vesa/Jokerit
Jymy-Kiekko
KalPa
KooVee
SaiPa
Kärpät
Karhut
WU
RU-38
Lahden Reipas
TuTo
SaPKo
Hermes
Upon Pallo
VehU
Ässät
Hilpara

Winners 
Until 1955 the Winner of the SM-sarja received the Aaro Kivilinna memorial award. After 1955 the winner was given the Kanada-malja ("Canada Cup") as the official rotating award of SM-sarja.

Notable players
 Juhani "Juuso" Wahlsten

See also 
 List of Finnish ice hockey champions

Liiga
Ice hockey leagues in Finland
Defunct ice hockey leagues in Europe